Davenport CitiBus is the transit agency serving Davenport, Iowa. USA. CitiBus connects with both Bettendorf Transit and the Illinois Quad Cities mass transit system, MetroLINK. The system operates Monday to Saturday.

History
Public transit appeared in Davenport in 1969. The authority at first provided monetary support to Davenport City Lines, a privately owned company owned by National City Lines. CitiBus is a division of the Department of Public Works. 

cityofdavenportiowa.com</ref>

Route list
1 Orange Line - Ground Transportation Center Via Rockingham Road to Hy-Vee
2 Teal Line Ground Transportation Center to Genesis East/Hy-Vee
3 Yellow Line - Ground Transportation Center to Rhythm City Casino
4 Red Line - Ground Transportation Center to 65th and Welcome Way and NorthPark Mall
5 Blue Line - West Kimberly Rd Wal-Mart to Wal-Mart Elmore Ave Via 53rd Street
6 Pink Line - Ground Transportation Center to 72nd and NW BLVD
7 Brown Line - Ground Transportation Center to Rock Island District Station, Illinois to Burlington Coat Factory Bettendorf
8 Green Line - West Kimberly Road Wal-Mart to Burlington Coat Factory Via Locust St.
9 Purple Line - Ground Transportation Center to West Kimberly Walmart
10 Magenta Line - Burlington Coat Factory Bettendorf to West Kimberly Road Wal-Mart Via Kimberly Road
Eastern Iowa Industrial Area Route Rock Island Station to North Davenport Industrial Park.

Ground Transportation Center
The Ground Transportation Center serves as the primary hub for Davenport Citibus, while also serving Burlington Trailways intercity buses. It was built in 1985 at 304 West River Drive. The center provides a waiting area with restrooms and other amenities for riders.

See also
 Bettendorf Transit
 Quad Cities MetroLINK
 List of intercity bus stops in Iowa
 List of bus transit systems in the United States

References

External links
 Davenport Citibus

Bus transportation in Iowa
Bus transportation in Illinois
Transit agencies in Iowa
Transportation in Davenport, Iowa
Transportation in the Quad Cities
Transport companies established in 1969
1969 establishments in Iowa